Piedras Negras International Airport is an international airport located  at Piedras Negras, Coahuila, Mexico, near the Mexico–United States border. It handles national air traffic for the bi-national metropolitan zone Piedras Negras–Eagle Pass, Texas.

Information 
It handled 24,170 passengers in 2019, and 9,481 passengers in 2020.

The airport has one terminal with one concourse.

Airlines and destinations

Piedras Negras previously had service on Aeromar, but currently has no scheduled commercial flights following Aeromar's collapse on February 15th, 2023.

Hotels   
 Quality Inn   
 Holiday Inn Express
 Best Western

See also 

 List of the busiest airports in Mexico

References

External links
 Coahuila State Government

Airports in Coahuila